WDJS (1430 AM) is a radio station broadcasting a Religious format. Licensed to Mount Olive, North Carolina, United States, the station is currently owned by the Ann Weldon Mayo Trust, through licensee Mount Olive Broadcasting Company, L.L.C.

External links

Radio stations established in 1995
DJS